Best Supporting Actor or Actress are accolades given by a group of film or television professionals in recognition of the work of supporting and character actors. Most awards for supporting actors are gender-specific.

Film

Male
 Academy Award for Best Supporting Actor
 AACTA Award for Best Actor in a Supporting Role
 AACTA International Award for Best Supporting Actor
 AVN Award for Best Supporting Actor
 BAFTA Award for Best Actor in a Supporting Role
 Black Reel Award: Best Supporting Actor
 Boston Society of Film Critics Award for Best Supporting Actor
 Broadcast Film Critics Association Award for Best Supporting Actor
 Canadian Screen Award for Best Supporting Actor
 César Award for Best Supporting Actor
 Chicago Film Critics Association Award for Best Supporting Actor
 Citra Award for Best Supporting Actor
 Dallas-Fort Worth Film Critics Association Award for Best Supporting Actor
 David di Donatello for Best Supporting Actor
 Empire Award for Best Supporting Actor
 Filmfare Award for Best Supporting Actor -Hindi
 Filmfare Award for Best Supporting Actor – Telugu
 Florida Film Critics Circle Award for Best Supporting Actor
 Genie Award for Best Performance by an Actor in a Supporting Role
 Golden Calf Award for Best Supporting Actor
 Golden Globe Award for Best Supporting Actor – Motion Picture
 Golden Raspberry Award for Worst Supporting Actor
 Goya Award for Best Supporting Actor
 Hong Kong Film Award for Best Supporting Actor
 Hundred Flowers Award for Best Supporting Actor
 Independent Spirit Award for Best Supporting Male
 Los Angeles Film Critics Association Award for Best Supporting Actor
 NAACP Image Award for Outstanding Supporting Actor in a Motion Picture
 National Board of Review Award for Best Supporting Actor
 National Film Award for Best Supporting Actor
 National Society of Film Critics Award for Best Supporting Actor
 New York Film Critics Circle Award for Best Supporting Actor
 Online Film Critics Society Award for Best Supporting Actor
 Polish Academy Award for Best Supporting Actor
 Prix Iris for Best Supporting Actor
 San Diego Film Critics Society Award for Best Supporting Actor
 San Francisco Film Critics Circle Award for Best Supporting Actor
 Satellite Award for Best Supporting Actor – Motion Picture
 Saturn Award for Best Supporting Actor
 Screen Actors Guild Award for Outstanding Performance by a Male Actor in a Supporting Role
 SIIMA Award for Best Supporting Actor – Telugu
 St. Louis Gateway Film Critics Association Award for Best Supporting Actor
 Toronto Film Critics Association Award for Best Supporting Actor
 Vancouver Film Critics Circle Award for Best Supporting Actor
 Washington D.C. Area Film Critics Association Award for Best Supporting Actor
 Zee Cine Award for Best Actor in a Supporting Role – Male

Female
 Academy Award for Best Supporting Actress
 AACTA Award for Best Actress in a Supporting Role
 AACTA International Award for Best Supporting Actress
 BAFTA Award for Best Actress in a Supporting Role
 Black Reel Award: Best Supporting Actress
 Boston Society of Film Critics Award for Best Supporting Actress
 Broadcast Film Critics Association Award for Best Supporting Actress
 Canadian Screen Award for Best Supporting Actress
 César Award for Best Supporting Actress
 Citra Award for Best Supporting Actress
 Chicago Film Critics Association Award for Best Supporting Actress
 Dallas-Fort Worth Film Critics Association Award for Best Supporting Actress
 David di Donatello for Best Supporting Actress
 Empire Award for Best Supporting Actress
 Filmfare Award for Best Supporting Actress - Hindi
Filmfare Award for Best Supporting Actress – Telugu
 Florida Film Critics Circle Award for Best Supporting Actress
 Genie Award for Best Performance by an Actress in a Supporting Role
 Golden Calf Award for Best Supporting Actress
 Golden Globe Award for Best Supporting Actress – Motion Picture
 Golden Horse Award for Best Supporting Actress
 Golden Raspberry Award for Worst Supporting Actress
 Goya Award for Best Supporting Actress
 Hong Kong Film Award for Best Supporting Actress
 Hundred Flowers Award for Best Supporting Actress
 Independent Spirit Award for Best Supporting Female
 Los Angeles Film Critics Association Award for Best Supporting Actress
 NAACP Image Award for Outstanding Supporting Actress in a Motion Picture
 National Board of Review Award for Best Supporting Actress
 National Film Award for Best Supporting Actress
 National Society of Film Critics Award for Best Supporting Actress
 New York Film Critics Circle Award for Best Supporting Actress
 Online Film Critics Society Award for Best Supporting Actress
 Polish Academy Award for Best Supporting Actress
 Prix Iris for Best Supporting Actress
 San Diego Film Critics Society Award for Best Supporting Actress
 San Francisco Film Critics Circle Award for Best Supporting Actress
 Satellite Award for Best Supporting Actress – Motion Picture
 Saturn Award for Best Supporting Actress
 Screen Actors Guild Award for Outstanding Performance by a Female Actor in a Supporting Role
SIIMA Award for Best Supporting Actress – Telugu
 St. Louis Gateway Film Critics Association Award for Best Supporting Actress
 Toronto Film Critics Association Award for Best Supporting Actress
 Vancouver Film Critics Circle Award for Best Supporting Actress
 Washington D.C. Area Film Critics Association Award for Best Supporting Actress
 Zee Cine Award for Best Actor in a Supporting Role – Female

Television

Male
 AACTA Award for Best Guest or Supporting Actor in a Television Drama
 British Academy Television Award for Best Supporting Actor
 Canadian Screen Award for Best Supporting Actor in a Comedy Series
 Canadian Screen Award for Best Supporting Actor in a Drama Program or Series
 Daytime Emmy Award for Outstanding Supporting Actor in a Drama Series
 Primetime Emmy Award for Outstanding Supporting Actor in a Comedy Series
 Primetime Emmy Award for Outstanding Supporting Actor in a Miniseries or a Movie
 Primetime Emmy Award for Outstanding Supporting Actor in a Drama Series
 Golden Globe Award for Best Supporting Actor – Series, Miniseries or Television Film
 Satellite Award for Best Supporting Actor – Series, Miniseries or Television Film
 Satellite Award for Best Supporting Actor – Television Series
 Saturn Award for Best Supporting Actor on Television
 TVB Anniversary Award for Best Supporting Actor

Female
 AACTA Award for Best Guest or Supporting Actress in a Television Drama
 Canadian Screen Award for Best Supporting Actress in a Comedy Series
 Canadian Screen Award for Best Supporting Actress in a Drama Program or Series
 Daytime Emmy Award for Outstanding Supporting Actress in a Drama Series
 Primetime Emmy Award for Outstanding Supporting Actress in a Comedy Series
 Primetime Emmy Award for Outstanding Supporting Actress in a Drama Series
 Primetime Emmy Award for Outstanding Supporting Actress in a Miniseries or a Movie
 Golden Globe Award for Best Supporting Actress – Series, Miniseries or Television Film
 Satellite Award for Best Supporting Actress – Series, Miniseries or Television Film
 Satellite Award for Best Supporting Actress – Television Series
 Saturn Award for Best Supporting Actress on Television
 TVB Anniversary Award for Best Supporting Actress

See also
 Lists of awards
 List of television awards
 Lists of acting awards

Supporting actor
Supporting actor
Lists of acting awards